Fast and Loose is a 1939 American thriller film directed by Edwin L. Marin and starring Robert Montgomery, Rosalind Russell and Reginald Owen. It is a sequel to the 1938 film Fast Company and was followed the same year by Fast and Furious. In each film, different actors played the crime-solving couple.

Plot
Rare booksellers Joel and Garda Sloane try to solve a murder, which hinges on a missing scrap of a William Shakespeare manuscript.

Cast
 Robert Montgomery as Joel Sloane
 Rosalind Russell as Garda Sloane
 Reginald Owen as Vincent Charlton
 Ralph Morgan as Nicholas "Nick" Torrent
 Etienne Girardot as Christopher Oates
 Alan Dinehart as David Hilliard
 Jo Ann Sayers as Christine Torrent
 Joan Marsh as Bobby Neville
 John Hubbard as Phil Sergeant
 Tom Collins as Gerald Torrent
 Sidney Blackmer as "Lucky" Nolan
 Donald Douglas as Inspector Forbes
 Ian Wolfe as Mr Wilkes
 Mary Forbes as Mrs Torrent
 Leonard Carey as Craddock, Mrs Torrent's butler

Critical reception
The New York Times wrote, "a sense of humor, a facile style, genial performances and just enough puzzlement to keep us from suspecting the least suspicious member of the cast".

References

External links
 

1939 films
1930s thriller films
1930s English-language films
Metro-Goldwyn-Mayer films
Films directed by Edwin L. Marin
Films with screenplays by Harry Kurnitz
American black-and-white films
American thriller films
1930s American films